Des Mitchell is a British DJ radio presenter and music producer, born in Birmingham, England. He is best known for his hit single 
"(Welcome) To the Dance" which peaked at number 5 on the UK Singles Chart in January 2000. He also remixed the hit single for 
DJ Quicksilver as Watergate for 'Heart Of Asia' which hit the UK charts at number 3 of the same year 2000. 

Other tracks from him include 'The World is Yours'  'Lets Stay Together' featuring Sharon Gitau. 'Desire' featuring Sarah (silky) Scott. 'Gotta Have House' as TMP.
'Call On Me' featuring Bobby Alexander. 'I Wanna See You Dance' as TMP featuring Des Mitchell. 'Everytime I See The Girl' featuring Des Mitchell.
Other projects include remix & studio production work with long time studio partner Jon Riley. Stolen Goodz studio of Leicester. George Morel studio of Miami.

He was born Desmond Watson Mitchell on 25 November 1957 at Birmingham general hospital to Enid Davis and Walford Mitchell. 
Home for the past 35 has been Spain, since 1989 in Palma, Mallorca.

Des Mitchell was a DJ/presenter for BBC Birmingham at Pebble Mill studios in 1982 with his own radio show playing reggae, funk & soul music from 1982 to 1985.
He currently since 2013 - 2021 works in radio for Radio Onemallorca presenting his dance drivetime show.

Des Mitchell can still be seen performing as a dj working around the world. 
   www.desmitchell.net 

 show

References

Year of birth missing (living people)
Living people
British DJs